West Lake is a freshwater lake in Hangzhou, China. It is divided into five sections by three causeways. There are numerous temples, pagodas, gardens, and natural/artificial islands within the lake. Gushan (孤山) is the largest natural island and three artificial islands: Xiaoyingzhou (小瀛洲), Huixin Pavilion (湖心亭), and Ruan Gongdun (阮公墩) stand at the middle of the lake. Leifeng Pagoda (雷峰塔) and Baochu Pagoda (保俶塔) are separated by the lake. Mirroring each other, the basic pattern of "one mountain, two towers, three islands, three banks, and five lakes" is formed.

West Lake is located at No. 1 Longjing Road, Xihu District, Hangzhou City, Zhejiang Province, in the west of Hangzhou City. The total area of the scenic spot is 49 square kilometers, the catchment area is 21.22 square kilometers, and the lake area is 6.38 square kilometers. 

West Lake has influenced poets and painters throughout Chinese history for its natural beauty and historic relics, and it has also been among the most important sources of inspiration for Chinese garden designers. It was made a UNESCO World Heritage Site in 2011, described as having "influenced garden design in the rest of China as well as Japan and Korea over the centuries" and reflecting "an idealized fusion between humans and nature".

History
The earliest recorded name for West Lake was the "Wu Forest River". The Book of Han's "Geography Column" says, "Qiantang, affiliated to the western governor general. Wu Forest Mountain (Wǔlínshān) is the origin of the Wu Forest River. Running east into the sea, it covers 830 li" (roughly). Other former names include the "Qian River", "Qiantang Lake", "Mingsheng Lake", "Jinniu Lake", "Shihan Lake", "Shang Lake", "Lianyan Lake", "Fangsheng Pond", "Xizi Lake", "Gaoshi Lake", "Xiling Lake", "Meiren Lake", "Xianzhe Lake", and "Mingyue Lake". But only two names were widely accepted in history and recorded in historical documents. One is "Qiantang Lake", due to the fact that Hangzhou was called "Qiantang" in ancient times. The other name is "West Lake", due to the lake being west of the city. The name "West Lake" first appeared in two poems of Bai Juyi, "Bestowed on guests as returning from West Lake in the evening and looking back to Gushan Temple" and "On the returning boat to Hangzhou". Since the Northern Song dynasty, most poems and articles of scholars used the name "West Lake", while the name "Qiantang Lake" was gradually deprecated. "The request of dredging West Lake" written by Su Shi was the first time that "West Lake" appeared in an official document.

Qin dynasty
Over 2,000 years ago, West Lake was still a part of the Qiantang River. Due to soil sedimentation, the feet of Wu Mountain and Baoshi Mountains, the surrounding mountains on the northern and southern sides of the lake, gradually stretched to form shoal heads. Later, these sand spits slowly merged into a bank, to which a lagoon emerged to the west; this was the old West Lake of the Qin and Han dynasties. "West Lake Dream Searching" , written by Zhang Dai, relates the story that Qin Shi Huang visited the area and moored his boat to a stone later developed into the Big Stone Buddhist Temple. The stone was located on Baoshi Mountain, north of the West Lake, and can still be seen. 

The lake was once a lagoon tens of thousands of years ago. Silt then blocked the way to the sea and the lake was formed. A drill in the lake-bed in 1975 found the sediment of the sea, which confirmed its origin. Artificial preservation prevented the lake from evolving into a marshland.

Sui dynasty
The short-lived Sui dynasty is noted for the great engineering works which it accomplished during its brief existence. After AD 610, the Jiangnan Canal was opened and connected to the North Canal. Thus, five major rivers of China (the Hai, Yellow, Huai, Yangtze, and Qiantang) were all connected: this facilitated transportation to and from Hangzhou and thus boosted the regional economy. Tourism in Hangzhou also started to boom.

Tang dynasty
In the Tang dynasty, West Lake had an area of roughly 10.8 square kilometers. The western and southern parts of the lake all extended to the foot of West Hill. The northeastern part stretched to Wulin Gate area. Pilgrims could take the boat to the hill-foot and walk up to the hill to worship. Due to the ongoing aggradation of the lake, together with the virtual lack of any hydraulic projects, in those days, the lake would flood after heavy rains and dry up during long droughts.

In September 781, the prominent statesman Li Mi was appointed the governor of Hangzhou. In order to supply fresh water, he creatively induced the water into the city. He ordered six wells dug in populous areas like Qiantang Gate and Yongjin Gate, and set up a "shadow conduit" (underground clay and bamboo pipes) to introduce lake water into the city. The six wells have long vanished today. The only existing relic from that time is the Xiangguo Well, located west of Jinting Bridge on Jiefang Road. The other five wells were Xi Well (to the west of Xiangguo Well), Fang Well (or Four-eyed Well), Jinniu Well (northwest of Xi Well), Baigui Well (west of Longxiang Bridge), and Xiaofang Well (or Six-eyed Well, inside Qiantang Gate, now Xiaoche Bridge area).

In the middle of the Zhenyuan era (785–804) in the Tang dynasty, poet and government official Bai Juyi was appointed the governor of Hangzhou. Already an accomplished and famous poet, his deeds at Hangzhou made him a great governor. He realized that the farmland nearby depended on the water of West Lake, but due to the negligence of previous governors, the old dyke had collapsed, and the lake so dried out that the local farmers were suffering from severe drought. He ordered the construction of a stronger and taller dyke, with a dam to control the flow of water, providing water for irrigation and mitigating the drought problem. The livelihood of local people of Hangzhou improved over the following years. Bai Juyi used his leisure time to enjoy the beauty of West Lake, visiting the lake almost every day. He ordered the construction of a causeway to allow crossing part of the lake on foot, instead of requiring the services of a boat. A causeway, the Baisha Causeway, is now commonly referred to as Bai Causeway in Bai Juyi's honour, but the original Bai Causeway no longer exists.

Five Dynasties
The most prominent eras in Hangzhou's development history, the Wuyue Kingdom (907–960) and Southern Song dynasty, had great impacts on West Lake. The comprehensive development and fundamental layout of West Lake occurred in these two Dynasties. During Five Dynasties and Ten Kingdoms period, the Wuyue Kingdom made Hangzhou its capital. It facilitated the transportation to coastal regions, and promoted trading with foreign countries like Japan and Korea. In the meantime, successive rulers in the Wuyue Kingdom paid great tribute to Buddhism, and built a number of temples, pagodas, shrines and grottos around the lake area. They expanded Lingyin Temple, founded Zhaoqing Temple, Jingci Temple, Li'an Temple, Liutong Temple and Taoguang Temple, and built Baochu Pagoda, Liuhe Pagoda, Leifeng Pagoda and White Pagoda. The area was thus acclaimed as "Buddhist Country". Lingyin Temple, Tianzhu Temple and the tide of Qiantang were the most famous scenic spots at that time. Due to the geological characteristics, earth deposited speedly in West Lake and dredging became a routine maintenance. Thus in AD 927, the king of Wuyue, Qian Liu, installed a lake-dredging army of 1,000 to mow grasses and deepen springs, and preserved the water body of the lake.

Song dynasty (The Northern Song and The Southern Song)

Over one hundred years later, at the beginning of the Song dynasty's Yuanyou era (1086–1094), another great poet, Su Shi (also known as Su Dongpo), came to Hangzhou to serve as its governor. At that time, the farmers suffered greatly drought again, due to overgrowth of the weeds at the bottom of the lake clogging the irrigation ducts. He ordered dredging of the lake and piled up all the mud into another causeway, in the style of Bai Causeway, but much wider and nearly three times as long: he also planted willow trees along its banks. This causeway was later named after him as the "Su Causeway". There are six bridges along the  Su Causeway, and they are called separately Yingbo, Suolan, Wangshan, Yadi, Dongpu, and Kuahong Bridge, which all symbolize the characteristics of the bridge itself and also expose the structural beauty and its colorful connotation. "Dawn on the Su Causeway in Spring " is one of the attractions.

Wu Zimu described the extravagance in his "Mengliang lu" (Dreaming Over a Bowl of Millet), "The life in Lin'an is luxurious in all seasons, full of delight and appreciation with no idle days. In the west there is a lovely lake with arresting scenes, and in the east the river tides are spectacular. Both are miracles." Besides pilgrims, the tourists in Hangzhou included envoys of foreign countries, businessmen, monks and scholar candidates of the imperial examination. The beauty of West Lake started to gain wide reputation. In those days, boating on the lake was a popular entertainment. According to records, there were hundreds of boats in the West Lake. All were delicately built, with exquisite carving and decorations, and glided gracefully on the water. Poet Lin Sheng vividly described the ostentation in his poem "On a hotel wall in Lin'an". In addition, poet Yang Wanli also acclaimed the engaging scenery of West Lake in the poem "Coming out of Jingci Temple at dawn to see Lin Zifang off", which greatly show how thriving this metropolis was at that time and how yearning it was for people at that time. The renowned painter Muqi Fachang came here and refounded the abandoned monastery Liutong Temple in 1215.

Yuan dynasty

In the Yuan dynasty, West Lake was still socially thriving, with a population full of exuberance for singing and dancing. Volume 23 of the Book of Yuan says, in the 2nd year of the Zhida era (1309), "in Hangzhou, Jiang-Zhe area, during half a year there were more than 1,200 foreign visitors. Foreigners Sangwu and Baoheding brought lions, panthers, crows and falcons. They stayed for 27 days. People and animals ate meat of more than 1,300 jin." Increasing number of businessmen and travelers from countries of Turkestan and western Europe came to visit Hangzhou. The most famous among them was Venetian explorer Marco Polo, who complimented Hangzhou in his travel notes as "the most splendid heavenly city in the world". In the late Yuan dynasty, there were "Qiantang Ten Scenic Spots", in addition to the "West Lake Ten Scenic Spots" of the Southern Song dynasty; the existence of which expanded the scope of tourism. During the Zhiyuan era of the reign of Kublai Khan, the lake was dredged, and renamed "pond of freeing captive animals" (放生池). Some of the lake area was gradually enriched and became cultivated zones. In the late Yuan dynasty, West Lake lacked governmental attention, and plutocrats and noblemen enclosed water zones, so that the lake deteriorated into a desolate state with most of its area silting up and turning into swampland.

Ming dynasty

In the later Yuan Dynasty and beginning of the Ming Dynasty, people attributed the collapse of the Southern Song Dynasty to the West Lake, because the upper class and emperors indulge themselves into the melody and wine with the sceneries of the lake. Therefore, people and the govern's didn't want to make it clean and thriving in case that this kind of thing happened again. But later in the Ming dynasty, Hangzhou began to restore its prosperity in the Xuande and Zhengtong eras (1426–1449). Then, the local government kept a close watch on West Lake. In the 16th year of the Hongzhi era (one source suggests it was the 3rd year of the Zhengde era) the then governor Yang Mengying, with the support of special envoy Ju Liang, obtained approval to dredge the lake, despite much resistance from local magnates. This project was funded by the Engineering Department. The West Lake Visit Guide recorded, "The work commenced in February... It took 152 days, and 6,700,000 men at a cost of 23,607 silver taels, and the removal of 3,481 acres of illegal fields... Thus, West Lake was restored to its image in the Tang and Song dynasties." The dredging project extended the water surface from west of Su Causeway to Hongchun Bridge and Mao Jia Bu. The excavated silt was used to broaden Su Causeway, and also used to build a long causeway in western Inside Lake, called "Yanggong Causeway".

Both in the Ming and Qing dynasties, West Lake was dredged several times. The silt dug up was heaped to form two islands in the lake, "Huxin Island" and "Xiao Ying Zhou".

In 1607, the governor of Qiantang County, Nie Xintang, constructed a circular causeway from south to west outside the Fangsheng Pond of the island "Xiao Ying Zhou", which resulted in a unique view of "Island in Lake, Lake in Island". In 1611, Yang Wanli subsequently built the outer bank, and the whole plot was realized by 1620. Outside the pond were erect three small stony pagodas, called "Three Ponds (or Pools) Mirroring the Moon", which often give also their name to the Xiao Ying island.

Qing Dynasty

The Kangxi and Qianlong emperors of the Qing dynasty toured South China and stopping by Hangzhou many times; which helped to expedite the revamping and rehabilitation of West Lake. The Kangxi Emperor visited Hangzhou five times, and wrote the names of "Ten Scenic Spots of West Lake" selected in the Southern Song dynasty. The local governor then inscribed the emperor's handwriting onto stelae and built pavilions over them. Thereafter those scenes such as "Two Peaks Piercing the Clouds" and "Moon over the Peaceful Lake in Autumn" acquired fixed locations for appreciation. During the reign of the Yongzheng Emperor, "Eighteen Scenic Sites of West Lake" had developed into a new nomenclature together with enriched tourism resources. The Qianlong Emperor visited Hangzhou six times, composing poems as well as erecting stelae for the "Ten Scenic Spots". He also wrote names for "Eight Scenic Spots of Dragon Well", bringing renown to the mountainous scenery of remote the Dragon Well region (Longjing). In the Qianlong era, two Hangzhou natives, brothers Qu Hao and Qu Han, co-authored a book called "A Glance at Lakes and Hills", recording as many as 1,016 tourist spots around West Lake. This is the earliest known travel guide in Hangzhou.

Due to extensive dredging projects, the lake area spread beyond the west of now Xishan Road to the neighborhood of Hongchun Bridge, Maojia Bu, Turtle Pond, and Chishan Bu. In the fifth year of the Yongzheng era, the governor of Zhejiang and Right Vice Director of the Court of Censors, Li Wei, spent 42,742 silver taels to dredge the lake. He built stone weirs in Jinsha Harbor, Chishan Bu, Jingjia Hill and Maojia Bu in order to store water and to flush out the lake silt. In 1800, Yan Jian, the governor of Zhejiang, beseeched the imperial court to support a hydraulic project in West Lake. The project was supervised by the governor of Zhejiang, Ruan Yuan, who had the excavated silt piled into a mound, which was then named "Ruan Gong Dun". By then, the modern configuration of West Lake was determined. In 1864, the West Lake Dredging Bureau was founded, and a Qiantang native, Ding Bin, was appointed as director.

Republican era to the end of the 20th century
From the end of the Qing dynasty to the Republican era, the Shanghai–Hangzhou–Ningbo and the Zhejiang–Jiangxi railways as well as the Hangzhou–Shanghai, Hangzhou–Nanjing, and Hangzhou–Ningbo highways were built. This facilitation of transportation encouraged the development of Hangzhou's tourism industry. Besides traditional pilgrims, more and more travelers came from domestic cities like Shanghai and Nanjing as well as from Europe, the United States and Japan. "The special memorial edition of Hangzhou government 10th anniversary" says, from 1930 to 1936, the recorded tourists to Hangzhou were counted to 32,845.

Hangzhou's tourism resources became more abundant in the Republican era, as scenic spots and cultural relics were steadily added around West Lake. The government converted the imperial garden of the imperial palace remaining from the Qing dynasty into a park, on Solitary Hill. In 1927, the park was renamed "Zhongshan Park" or "Sun Yat-sen Park". On the left side of the park, the Zhejiang Martyrs' Memorial was built, honoring those deceased when the Zhejiang army captured Jinling. In addition, tombs for Xu Xilin and Qiu Jin were constructed near Xiling Bridge. In 1917, the Dabei Pavilion in Lingyin Temple was erected, and the Yue Wang Temple and Yue Fei's tomb were renovated several times. From 1923 to 1931, the Huanglong Dong was built. From 1923 to 1924, the deserted Qian King Temple was renovated and converted to a garden. In 1933, the leaning Baochu Pagoda was revamped.

The construction of parks in Hangzhou started with Lakeside Park in the Republican era. In 1912, the military government of Zhejiang demolished the city walls from Qiantang Gate to Yongjin Gate as well as the fortress of banners, and built Hubing Rd along the lakeside. Hurdles were put up 20 meters from the lake and flowers and trees were planted. The area was called "Lakeside Park", covering around one Chinese mile and was divided into five parks, first to fifth. In the spring of 1930, the city government paved a land of around 21 mu with mud dredged out of the lake from north of Changsheng Rd to Qiantang Gate, and founded Sixth Park. From 1928 to 1933, Zhejiang's provincial government erected "Chen Yingshi Statue", "North Expedition Martyr Memorial Tower" and "Martyrs of 88 Division in Songhu Campaign Memorial Stela" at the piers of Third Park, Second Park and Fifth Park, respectively.

Due to continuous digging by stealth on its base, Leifeng Pagoda, after lasting nearly a thousand years, collapsed all of a sudden on September 25, 1924. It was shocking news in media. Lu Xun purposely wrote "Comment on the Collapse of Leifeng Pagoda" and "Second Comment on the Collapse of Leifeng Pagoda", making a remark on this incident. The fall of Leifeng Pagoda also put an end to one of "Ten Scenes of West Lake", "Leifeng Pagoda in the Sunset".

From June 6 to October 20, 1929, the government of Zhejiang hosted the first "West Lake Expo", and total participants numbered over 20 million. The location of West Lake Expo was set at areas around the lakeside, such as Broken Bridge, Solitary Hill, Yue-Wang Temple, and North Hill. The primary purpose of the expo was to promote national products and encourage enterprises. Besides over 1,000 delegate groups from nationwide, involved included delegates from America, Japan, Britain, Indonesia and other countries. It was the largest and longest pageant in Hangzhou during the Republican era.

After the establishment of the People's Republic of China in 1949, Hangzhou was among the first places opened to tourism. The city government preserved the mountain area around the lake and planted a large number of trees. Meanwhile, West Lake was extensively dredged. Within West Lake scenery zone, a new botanical garden and flower garden was opened. Fish Viewing at the Flower Pond park, and Orioles Singing in the Willows park were constructed. Fish Viewing at the Jade Springs and Yongjin Park were rebuilt. Lingyin Temple, Jingci Temple, Yue-Wang Temple, Three Ponds Mirroring the Moon, Lake-heart Pavilion and other spots were renovated. In addition, West Huanhu Rd (Xishan Rd), Longjin Rd and Jiuxi Rd were newly built. In 1959, West Lake of Hangzhou received over 1,400 foreign tourists, over 2,300 tourists from Hong Kong and Macao and over five million domestic visitors.

During the Cultural Revolution Liutong Temple and another temple were destroyed.

After the Cultural Revolution, the number of tourists to West Lake increased again. In 1978, it received 53,000 tourists from overseas and Hong Kong and Macao combined, in addition to about six million domestic travelers.

In May 1983, the state council named Hangzhou "Famed Historical and Cultural City" and "National Key Scenic Tourism City". In September 1984, the executive office of state council instructed that Hangzhou evolve to the tourism center of Southeast China and a first-class international scenic tourism city. Thereafter Hangzhou government refurbished Lingyin Temple, Tianzhu Temple, Jingci Temple, Yue-Wang Temple, Dacheng Hall, stela pavilions of "Ten Scenes" and other relics. Resorts such as Galloping Tiger Spring were expanded. Curved Yard and Lotus Pool in Summer park was founded. New spot "Exploring Plum Blossoms at Ling Peak" was opened. Archaizing carnivals were held in Huanglong Dong and Ruangong Dun. There were also night gardens and music night markets for amusement.

In 1949, West Lake silted up, with average depth of merely 0.55 meters and capacity only 4 million cubic meters. Marshy weeds blanketed the lake bed so that large boat could only make their ways through specific channels. In 1950, the government listed West Lake dredging as a national investment project. Hangzhou launched the West Lake Dredging Project in 1951 to excavate the silt thoroughly. By 1954, all the work had been mechanized. The project concluded in 1959. As a result, the achieved average depth was 1.808 meters with nadir of 2.6 meters. The capacity elevated to 10,271,900 cubic meters. The silt was used to fill 18 ponds or lacunae in surrounding areas including Zhaoqing Temple and Qingbo Park. However, because of the erosion and sediment on lake bed afterward, the depth of the water lessened to 1.47 meters. The government thus invested two million yuan in 1976 to dredge the lake again. By 1980, the depth increased to 1.5 meters. Besides dredging work, the city government substantially fortified the lake shore, resulting in a bank of total length of 29,800 meters. That was the largest bank enhancement project in the history of West Lake. Along with the project, more than 10 piers for mooring the boats were renovated or newly built in Lakeside Park, Zhongshan Park, Yue Fei's tomb and both sides of Su Causeway.

The West Lake Diversion Project was inaugurated on 1 February 1985. The project built a pump at Zhakou section of Qiantang River, and drew 300,000 cubic meters of water daily, equivalent to one thirty-third of total capacity of the lake. As a consequence, the lake's water body transparency was increased by 5 to 7 cm. Other the other hand, The lake-wide sewage interception project was launched in 1978, and was finished in 1981. It was divided into three branches, southern, western and northern, buried sewage tunnels of over 17 kilometers, and was equipped with 10 pumping stations.

In 1984, five organizations including Hangzhou Daily newspaper sponsored voting for the "New Ten Scenes in West Lake". The elected new scenes are Cloud-Sustained Path in a Bamboo Grove, Misty Trees by Nine Streams, Dreams at Galloping Tiger Spring, Yellow Dragon Cave Dressed in Green, Sweet Osmanthus Rain at Manjuelong Village, Clouds Scurrying over Jade Emperor Hill, Inquiring about Tea at Dragon Well, Precious Stone Hill Floating in Rosy Clouds, Heavenly Wind over Wushan Hill, and Ruan's Mound Encircled by Greenness. While embracing both exquisite natural beauty and abundant cultural deposits, West Lake of Hangzhou was among the first "National Key Scenic Tourist Resorts" in 1982, and elected one of "Ten Chinese Scenic Sites" in 1985.

After 71 years, the West Lake Expo was launched in Xi Hu in 2000. The new exhibition was held from October 20 to November 10, attracting 1,400,000 tourists domestic and overseas. The tourism industry brought in 1.12 billion RMB. The Expo greatly enhanced the reputation of West Lake domestically and internationally. Thereafter the West Lake Expo was made a conventional annual celebration.

Images of the West Lake have appeared various times on Chinese currency. The picture of "Three Ponds Mirroring the Moon" was printed on the backs of both the foreign exchange certificate one yuan bill issued by the government in 1979 and the fifth version of RMB one yuan bill issued in 2004.

Literary works
Over the centuries, the beauty and culture of West Lake has attracted numerous literati, who left behind works of literature and poetry to describe the lake. For example, Dream in West Lake and The Enchiridion of Lake and Mountain recorded a lot about West Lake and ancient Hangzhou historic anecdotes. Poets such as Bai Juyi, Su Shi, Xu Zhimo and Hu Shih also wrote countless poems about West Lake. The Chinese legend Legend of the White Snake is also set in West Lake in Hangzhou and has been adapted into films and television series over the years.

West Lake Southern Side Renovation Project
Entering the 21st century, West Lake witnessed several environmental renovation projects. First of them was "West Lake Southern Side Renovation Project". From February to October 2002, Hangzhou government incorporated four large parks on the southern side of the lake, and these four parks have been free to public 24 hours a day, 7 days a week. On October 25, 2002, on the old site of the Leifeng Pagoda which collapsed 78 years ago, a new pagoda with height of 71.7 meters was erected.

Geography
About the formation of West Lake, there are few records in ancient documents. The "West Lake Sight-Seeing Record" says, "West Lake is surrounded by mountains on three sides. Streams wander down the hills into the pond. There're hundreds of springs underneath. Accumulated water forms the lake." Modern scholars studied topography, geology, sediment and hydrodynamics, and generally held that West Lake was a lagoon formed gradually from a gulf. In 1920, scientist Zhu Kezhen published "The Cause of Formation of West Lake in Hangzhou" after examining the topography around the lake. He claimed, "West Lake originally was a little bay on left side of Qiantang River. Later the earth in the river sedimented and slowly corked the mouth of the bay, hence a lagoon formed." Zhu postulated, based on the calculation of the rate of sedimentation, that West Lake was formed about 12,000 years ago, when the lake would have been significantly larger than now; and, that the lake's water area had gradually shrunk, due to its being filled by sediments carried down from the creeks in the hills which surround it on three sides. West Lake would no longer exist today without all the dredging work done in the historical period. In 1924, geologist Zhang Hongzhao published "One Explanation of the Formation of West Lake". While supporting Zhu's arguments, he supplemented that the formation of West Lake started with tidal force building the lake bank. Later, the alterations of the beach helped to maintain the water level. These were two prerequisites to the formation of the lake.

Hydrological characteristics 
The outline of the lake body of the West Lake is almost oval, the bottom of the lake is relatively flat. The catchment area of the west lake is 21.22 square kilometers, with annual runoff of 14 million cubic meters and storage of nearly 14 million cubic meters. The west lake draws water from the Qiantang River, about 120 million cubic meters per year. The natural surface water sources of the lake are Jinsha stream(金沙涧), long hong stream(龙泓涧), Qishan stream (huiyin stream)(赤山涧（慧因涧）) and changqiao stream(长桥溪).

The storage capacity is about 14.294 million cubic meters. The average depth of the lake is 2.27 meters, with the deepest being about 5 meters and the shallowest being less than 1 meter. The average annual precipitation on the lake is 5.629 million cubic meters. The scour coefficient of the water system is 1.49. When the gate of the reservoir is closed in a dry season, the flow rate is equal to 0. Even in the flood period, the general flow rate is only below 0.05 m/s.

The water level of the lake is maintained at the yellow sea level of 7.15 meters, ±0.05 meters. The highest water level of 7.70 meters and the lowest water level of 6.92 meters, with a difference of 50 centimeters.

Ecology

Flora

Around the west lake, there are 184 families 739 genera 1369 species of seed plants, including 28 species of gymnosperms in 19 genera and 7 families, 1273 species of angiosperms in 675 genera and 150 families, 68 species of ferns in 45 genera and 27 families. Currently, there are 21 species of rare plants are listed in the first-grade state protection, including Zhejiang nan, wild soybean and short spike bamboo, and 63 species are listed the second-grade state protection.

Peach Blossom: On the lake banks and Su and Bai Causeways a large number of willows and peach trees are planted. It is said one willow is accompanied by one peach tree. Other horticultural plants include magnolia, cherry, Confederate rose, etc. The blooming season of peach tree in Hangzhou usually ranges from end of February to middle of April.

Lotus: Some sites in Hangzhou were named after lotus, such as lotus pond and lotus lane. There is traditional food called "lotus cake". The fossil of lotus seeds was unearthed at Kuahuqiao site in Xiaoshan, which indicates at least before the Tang dynasty there was cultivated lotus. Yang Wanli of the Song dynasty wrote poem, "Lotus leaves grow to the sky with endless green, lotus blossoms bathed in the sunlight appear especially red., which brought high reputation to the lotus in West Lake. Nowadays, there are 14 lotus cultivation areas in the lake, totally 130 Chinese acres. Most are in "North Inside Lake" and "Yue Lake". According to statistics, West Lake lotus starts to bloom in early June, and reaches peak blossom time in late June. It can last till late August or early September.

Osmanthus: As the city flower, osmanthus is one of representative plants of Hangzhou. Poet Bai Juyi wrote "search osmanthus around the temple on hill in the middle of Autumn", indicating osmanthus had been cultivated as early as in the Tang dynasty. Osmanthus trees have been massively planted in parks around the lake, and the best-known locations to appreciate are "Sweet Osmanthus Rain at Manjuelong Village", one of "New Ten Scenes of West Lake", and Hangzhou Botanical Garden. Osmanthus can be divided into four major species, Thunbergii group, Latifolius Group, Aurantiacus Group and Fragrans Division. Among them, the Thunbergii and Latifolius are the best. Every year around mid-autumn, the sweet-scented osmanthus blossoming is a highlight of tourism in Hangzhou. In addition to its elegant looks, osmanthus is also edible. Thunbergii and Latifolius boast intensive sweet scent, and are natural ingredients for seasoning. Pickled osmanthus blossoms mixed with white sugar became a traditional food of Hangzhou, "Sweet Osmanthus". West Lake Osmanthus blooming period commences from early September, lasting till early November.

Plum blossom: Lin Bu, a famous recluse in the Song dynasty, lived on Solitary Hill. His poem Little Plum Blossom of Hill Garden became the best known poem praising the flower and enriched the cultural contributions of the plum blossoms of West Lake. The opening line of the poem says, "When everything has faded they alone shine forth, encroaching on the charms of smaller gardens". Ling Peak, Solitary Hill and West Creek have long been the three finest spots of plum blossom cherishing in Hangzhou. The flowering season is typically around the Spring Festival, from late January to middle February.

Tulip: The "Prince Bay Park" of Hangzhou imported almost all species of tulips from Netherlands in 1992, and held annual tulips exhibition ever since. It has become a new scenic spot on the lake bank. The normal tulips blossom season spans from middle of March to end of April.

Fauna

Mallards, halcyons and koi carp are among the most frequently spotted animals in the lake. Squirrels loiter among the trees on the bank.

Influences

West Lake is said to be the incarnation of Xi Shi, one of the Four Beauties of ancient China. Since ancient times, West Lake was associated with a large number of romantic poets, profound philosophers, national heroes and heroines. West Lake was also the retreat for many Chinese writers of the past. The Northern Song Dynasty poet Lin Bu, shunning the life of being an official, lived in seclusion by West Lake for twenty years, and dedicated himself to the cultivation of peach and plum blossoms. The great Ming dynasty essayist Zhang Dai, wrote a number of essays about West Lake in Reminiscence and Dream of Tao'an, and a whole book: Search for West Lake in Dreams. West Lake has had a profound impact on Far Eastern landscape designs, and its features have often been imitated by other palaces and gardens, such as Kunming Lake at the Summer Palace in Beijing, the central ponds of the Kyu Shiba Rikyu Garden and Koishikawa Kōrakuen Garden in Tokyo, Japan, among others.

Due to its prominent historical and cultural status, West Lake was selected as a National Key Scenic Resort in 1982, one of Ten Scenic Resorts in 1985 and a national 5A tourist resort in 2006.

Along with its cultural importance, West Lake historically was also of value for local commercial fishermen. According to statistics from 1977, the lake had an annual fish yield of 1300 kg/hectare, quite a bit more than for some larger lakes (that is, East Lake of Wuhan had a yield of only 450 kg/ha).

Attractions

Other attractions include:
 Yue Fei Temple, the tomb and memorial hall to Yue Fei.
 Lingyin Temple, a Buddhist monastery and surrounding hills.
 Long Jing tea farms, an area renowned for the quality of Tea.
 Jingci Temple
 Galloping Tiger Spring, a spring famous for its mineral water
 Tomb of Su Xiao Xiao
 The West Lake Museum (located on the lake shore) is dedicated to the cultural heritage of the West Lake.
 Former Residence of Chiang Ching-kuo

Ten Scenes of West Lake
Traditionally, there are ten best-known scenic spots on the West Lake, each remembered by a four-character epithet. Collectively, they are known as the "Ten Scenes of West Lake" (10 Scenic Spots in West Lake ). Each is marked by a stele with an epithet written in the calligraphy of the Qianlong Emperor. They are:

 Dawn on the Su Causeway in Spring
 Curved Yard and Lotus Pool in Summer
 Moon over the Peaceful Lake in Autumn
 Remnant Snow on the Bridge in Winter
 Leifeng Pagoda in the Sunset
 Two Peaks Piercing the Clouds
 Orioles Singing in the Willows
 Fish Viewing at the Flower Pond
 Three Ponds Mirroring the Moon
 Evening Bell Ringing at the Nanping Hill
 Spring Dawn at Su Causeway (苏堤春晓)

Gallery

Notes and references

See also

 Slender West Lake
 West Lake (Huizhou)

External links

Hangzhou Government website
TRAVELZHEJIANG
Ten Classic Scenes of West Lake in History
Official Travel Guide of West Lake – Hangzhou Tourism Commission
Hangzhou West Lake: Too many places, too little time

Geography of Hangzhou
Lakes of China
Lakes of Zhejiang
Parks in Zhejiang
World Heritage Sites in China
Tourist attractions in Hangzhou
AAAAA-rated tourist attractions